Danilo Innocenti (27 March 1904 – 26 May 1949) was an Italian male pole vaulter, who participated at the 1936 Summer Olympics.

Biography
He won ten times, in eleven years from 1927 to 1937, the national championships at senior level.

Achievements

National titles
Italian Athletics Championships
Pole vault: 1926, 1927, 1928, 1930, 1931, 1932, 1933, 1934, 1935, 1936, 1937

References

External links
 

1904 births
1949 deaths
People from Sesto Fiorentino
Italian male pole vaulters
Olympic athletes of Italy
Athletes (track and field) at the 1936 Summer Olympics
Sportspeople from the Metropolitan City of Florence